Vladimír Čech (25 September 1914 – 2 February 1992) was a Czechoslovak film director and screenwriter. He directed more than 35 films between 1941 and 1980. His 1971 film The Key was entered into the 7th Moscow International Film Festival where it won the Silver Prize.

Selected filmography
 The Key (1971)

References

External links

1914 births
1992 deaths
Czechoslovak film directors
Czechoslovak screenwriters
Film people from České Budějovice